Won-sik, also spelled Won-shik, is a Korean masculine given name. Its meaning differs based on the hanja used to write each syllable of the name. There are 35 hanja with the reading "won" and 16 hanja with the reading "sik" on the South Korean government's official list of hanja which may be registered for use in given names.

Min Won-sik (1886–1921), Joseon Dynasty official and journalist
Im Won-sik (1919–2002), Korean conductor, composer, and musical pedagogue
Chung Won-shik (born 1928), South Korean politician, 23rd Prime Minister
Woo Won-shik (born 1957), South Korean politician with the Minjoo Party of Korea
Lee Won-shik (born 1973), South Korean footballer
Kim Won-sik (born 1991), South Korean footballer
Ravi (rapper) (born Kim Won-shik, 1993), South Korean singer and rapper, member of boy band VIXX

See also
List of Korean given names

References

Korean masculine given names